Griffin Dillon (born April 25, 2003) is an American soccer player who plays as a midfielder for Real Monarchs in the MLS Next Pro.

Club career
Born in San Diego, California, Dillon began his career with La Roca Football Club, a youth development club side in his home state. At one point, Dillon was La Roca's captain. In December 2020, Dillon committed verbally that he would attend the University of Maryland and play college soccer with the Maryland Terrapins as part of their incoming class of 2021. In 2021, Dillon joined Real Monarchs, the USL Championship side of Major League Soccer club Real Salt Lake. He made his senior debut for the club on May 14, 2021 against LA Galaxy II, coming on as a halftime substitute during a 2–0 defeat.

On February 2, 2023, Dillon left college after two seasons to re-join Real Monarchs.

Career statistics

Personal
Dillon has two brothers, one who is currently playing and father who played college soccer. His brother Trevor plays for Utah Tech University while his father Mark played for the Marquette Golden Eagles.

References

2003 births
Living people
Sportspeople from Utah
American soccer players
Association football midfielders
Real Monarchs players
USL Championship players
Soccer players from Utah
Maryland Terrapins men's soccer players